Jack Tregoning (13 June 1919 – 26 June 1989) was an Australian cricketer. He played in two first-class matches for South Australia between 1939 and 1948.

See also
 List of South Australian representative cricketers

References

External links
 

1919 births
1989 deaths
Australian cricketers
South Australia cricketers
Cricketers from Adelaide